The 1957–58 NCAA University Division men's basketball season began in December 1957, progressed through the regular season and conference tournaments, and concluded with the 1958 NCAA University Division basketball tournament championship game on March 22, 1958, at Freedom Hall in Louisville, Kentucky. The Kentucky Wildcats won their fourth NCAA national championship with an 84–72 victory over the Seattle Chieftains.

Season headlines 
 Adolph Rupp won his fourth championship as he led the Kentucky Wildcats to an 84–72 win over the Seattle Chieftains and their star, Elgin Baylor. The starting unit was nicknamed the "Fiddlin' Five," after a quip by Rupp that his team were fiddlers when he really needed violinists. The Wildcats fought back from two 11-point deficits to gain the victory.
 Cincinnati's Oscar Robertson became the first player to lead the nation is scoring in his first varsity season. The sophomore (freshmen were ineligible) averaged 35.1 points per game for the Bearcats.
 Dom Flora, a senior point guard at Washington and Lee University, finished his college career with 2,310 points and 696 free throws made, both of which were ranked fifth in their respective categories in college basketball history at the end of the 1957–58 season.
 Future Hall of Fame coach Howard Cann of NYU retired at the conclusion of the season, after 35 years at the helm.

Major rule changes 
Beginning in 1957–58, the following rules changes were implemented:

 Offensive goaltending was banned so that no player from either team could touch the ball or basket when the ball was on the basket’s rim or above the cylinder. The only exception was the shooter in the original act of shooting.
 One free throw for each common foul was taken for the first six personal fouls by one team in each half, and the one-and-one was used thereafter.
 On uniforms, the use of the single-digit numbers one and two and any digit greater than five were prohibited.
 A ball that passes over the backboard – either front-to-back or back-to-front — was considered out of bounds.

Conference membership changes

Regular season

Conference winners and tournaments

Informal championships

Statistical leaders

Polls 

The final top 20 from the AP and Coaches Polls.

Post-season tournaments

NCAA tournament 

Adolph Rupp's Kentucky Wildcats won their fourth National Championship by defeating the Seattle Chieftains 84–72 on March 22 at Freedom Hall in Louisville, Kentucky. Seattle's Elgin Baylor led all tournament scorers and was named the tournament Most Outstanding Player.

Final Four 

 Third Place – Temple 67, Kansas State 57

National Invitation tournament 

The Xavier Musketeers entered the National Invitation Tournament with a 15–11 record, but surprised the field, defeating fellow Ohio school Dayton 78–74 to win the NIT. The Musketeers' Hank Stein was named tournament MVP.

NIT Semifinals and Final 
Played at Madison Square Garden in New York City 

 Third Place – St. Bonaventure 84, St. John's 69

Award winners

Consensus All-American teams

Major player of the year awards 

 Helms Foundation Player of the Year: Elgin Baylor, Seattle
 UPI Player of the Year: Oscar Robertson, Cincinnati
 Sporting News Player of the Year: Oscar Robertson, Cincinnati

Major coach of the year awards 

 UPI Coach of the Year: Tex Winter, Kansas State

Other major awards 

 Robert V. Geasey Trophy (Top player in Philadelphia Big 5): Guy Rodgers, Temple
 NIT/Haggerty Award (Top player in NYC): Jim Cunningham, Fordham

Coaching changes 
A number of teams changed coaches throughout the season and after the season ended.

References